Stormwatch may refer to:

 Stormwatch (album), a 1979 album by Jethro Tull
 Stormwatch (comics), a fictional superhero team in the Wildstorm and DC Universes
 Storm Watch, a 2002 American science fiction film

See also 
 Storm warning, a maritime weather alert